The 23rd Annual Black Reel Awards ceremony, presented by the Foundation for the Augmentation of African-Americans in Film (FAAAF) and honoring the best films of 2022, took place on February 6, 2023, and streamed on blackreelawards.com at 5:00 p.m. PST / 8:00 p.m. EST. During the ceremony, FAAAF presented the Black Reel Awards in 24 categories. The film nominations were announced on December 15, 2022.

Black Panther: Wakanda Forever and The Woman King led the film nominations with fourteen each, with the latter winning a total of six awards, the most wins by any film, including Outstanding Film.

With her third win for Outstanding Costume Design for Black Panther: Wakanda Forever, Ruth E. Carter became the most decorated technical award winner in Black Reel Awards history. Actress Angela Bassett also made history, becoming the first woman ever to win an acting and honorary award in the same year; she won for her work in Black Panther: Wakanda Forever and also received the prestigious Sidney Poitier Trailblazer Award, recognizing her career of acting excellence.

Film winners and nominees

Honorary awards
 Vanguard Award – Effie T. Brown
 Sidney Poitier Trailblazer Award – Angela Bassett
 Ruby Dee Humanitarian Award – Kerry Washington
 Oscar Micheaux Impact Award – Debra Martin Chase

Films with multiple nominations and awards

The following films received multiple nominations:

The following films received multiple awards:

References

External links
 Official website

2022 film awards
Black Reel Awards
Voice acting awards
2022 in American cinema
2022 awards in the United States